Xavier 'Xavi' Barrau (born 26 September 1982) is a French former professional footballer.

Career
He formerly played for CS Louhans-Cuiseaux, ES Viry-Châtillon and La Roche VF in France, Bradford City, Darlington and Walsall in England, FC Meyrin in Switzerland and Airdrie United and Gretna in Scotland.

At Bradford City he made 2 substitute appearances before making his first start in the final game of the season, scoring twice.

Barrau signed for Hamilton Academcial (another club in Scotland) on 1 January 2008 on a six-month contract. However, he was released in April 2008 to return to France. He left Hamilton after his then-wife complained of feeling homesick.

At the beginning of the 2008–09 season Xavier signed for French club ES Fréjus who play in CFA Group B.

As of January 2015, Barrau was running a chauffeuring business in the south of France.

References

External links

1982 births
Living people
French footballers
French expatriate footballers
Expatriate footballers in England
Expatriate footballers in Switzerland
Expatriate footballers in Scotland
ES Viry-Châtillon players
Airdrieonians F.C. players
Gretna F.C. players
Bradford City A.F.C. players
Darlington F.C. players
Hamilton Academical F.C. players
ÉFC Fréjus Saint-Raphaël players
English Football League players
Scottish Football League players
Association football midfielders